WLBJ may refer to:

 WLBJ-LP, a defunct low-power radio station (104.1 FM) formerly licensed to serve Fostoria, Ohio, United States
 WLBJ (defunct), a defunct radio station (1410 AM) formerly licensed to serve Bowling Green, Kentucky, United States
 WLRS (AM), a radio station (1570 AM) licensed to serve New Albany, Indiana, United States, which held the call sign WLBJ from 2003 to 2005